Anna Leszczyńska may refer to:
 Anna Leszczyńska (1660–1727), Polish noble lady and the mother of King of Poland Stanisław I Leszczyński
 Anna Leszczyńska (1699–1717), eldest daughter of King Stanisław Leszczyński of Poland (later Duke of Lorraine) and Katarzyna Opalińsk